Patternmaker may refer to:

Patternmaker (engineering)
Patternmaker (clothing)